Ali Madani is a former tennis player from Iran.

Career
Madani took part Davis Cup campaigns for Iran. 

Madani competed in Men's doubles at the 1979 US Open where he partnered Mike Myburg but were beaten by Steve Docherty and John James in the first round.

He won the silver medal in Men's Tennis Doubles partnering Kambiz Derafshijavan at the 1974 Asian Games in Tehran.

His highest single record was 266 (16 January 1978).

References

Iranian male tennis players
Year of birth missing (living people)
Living people
Asian Games medalists in tennis
Asian Games silver medalists for Iran
Tennis players at the 1974 Asian Games
Medalists at the 1974 Asian Games